The Quai d'Orsay is the name of a street along the Seine in Paris, used as a dock in the Middle Ages. The term may also refer to:
 The French Ministry of Foreign Affairs, located on the Quai d'Orsay
 Quai d'Orsay (cigar brand)
 Quai d'Orsay (comic book), an award-winning comic book
 Quai d'Orsay (film), a cinematic adaptation of the comic book